Ram Sajan Pandey (1 January 1957 – 7 May 2021) was the vice chancellor of Baba Mast Nath University (BMU), Rohtak, Haryana.

Biography
He had joined BMU in 2018. Previously he had worked as Hindi professor in Maharshi Dayanand University and Indira Gandhi University, Rewari for 33 years. He died due to COVID-19 complications in Rohtak on 7 May 2021, at 11:00 am.

Books
He authored 33 books, including:

References

Place of birth missing
1957 births
2021 deaths
Academic staff of Baba Mastnath University
Deaths from the COVID-19 pandemic in India